Plymouth High School is a public high school located in Plymouth, Indiana, United States.

Statistics
In the 2020-21 school year, total enrollment is at 1,095 students.

In the 2021-22 school year the ethnicity breakdown was:
White - 66.2%
Hispanic - 29.1%
Black - 0.9%
Asian - 1.0%
Multi-racial - 2.6%

Notable alumni
Clifford L. Linedecker, American investigative journalist and author of true crime books
Scott Skiles, former NBA basketball player and coach. Led Plymouth High School to the 1982 IHSAA State Basketball Championship.
Morgan Uceny, retired American track and field athlete who participated in the 2012 Summer Olympics in London.

See also
 List of high schools in Indiana

References

External links
 Official Website

Buildings and structures in Marshall County, Indiana
Public high schools in Indiana